Irvine may refer to:

Places

On Earth

Antarctica

Irvine Glacier
Mount Irvine (Antarctica)

Australia

Irvine Island
Mount Irvine, New South Wales

Canada

Irvine, Alberta
Irvine Inlet, Nunavut

United Kingdom

Irvine, North Ayrshire, Scotland
Irvine Royal Academy
Irvine Meadow XI F.C.
Irvine RFC
Irvine Victoria F.C.
Irvine railway station
Irvine Bank Street railway station
Irvine Valley, Ayrshire, Scotland, an alternative name for Loudoun
River Irvine, Scotland
Irvine Bay, Scotland

United States

Irvine, California
University of California, Irvine
Irvine Valley College
Irvine Unified School District
Irvine High School (Irvine, California)
Irvine (train station)
Lake Irvine, California
Irvine, Florida
Irvine, Kentucky
Irvine Park Historic District, Minnesota
Irvine Township, Benson County, North Dakota
Irvine Railroad, Pennsylvania

In space

6825 Irvine, main-belt asteroid

People
Irvine (name), including a list of people with the name
Clan Irvine, Scottish clan

Art, entertainment, and media

Fictional characters
Irvine Kinneas, fictional character in the 1999 video game Final Fantasy VIII
Irvine, fictional character from the anime Zoids: Chaotic Century
Irvine (Grouch), Oscar’s niece in the children’s show Sesame Street

Music
"Irvine", 2007 song on the Kelly Clarkson album My December

Enterprises and organizations
Irvine Company, owner of a ranch comprising nearly a third of Orange County, California
James Irvine Foundation, philanthropic nonprofit organization to benefit the people of California

Titles
Earl of Irvine, title in the Peerage of Scotland
Viscount of Irvine, title in the Peerage of Scotland

Other uses
Irvine's white, alternative name from the French wine grape Ondenc
Richard F. Irvine Riverboat, riverboat at Walt Disney World

See also

 Earvin
 Ervin (disambiguation)
 Ervine
 Erving (disambiguation)
 Erwan
 Erwin (disambiguation)
 Irv (disambiguation)
 Irve (disambiguation)
 Irvin
 Irving (disambiguation)
 Irwin (disambiguation)